Tanglin is a planning area located within the Central Region of Singapore. Tanglin is located west of Newton, Orchard, River Valley and Singapore River, south of Novena, east of Bukit Timah, northeast of Queenstown and north of Bukit Merah.

Etymology and history

On 7 November 2006, the Singapore Land Authority (SLA) called for proposals to liven up the Dempsey Road area when it launched two new tenders for sites there. In doing so, it also announced that it has plans for the area up to 2015. Known as Tanglin Village, the former Central Manpower Base has now been transformed into a commercial plaza best accessed via car or taxi. The uniquely interesting barracks buildings have been well preserved and currently house a variety of retail establishments such as high end antique shops, restaurants, galleries and the like. Tanglin Village also houses popular hangouts such as alfresco bars Hacienda and RedDot BrewHouse.

Geography 
Tanglin planning area is bounded by Bukit Timah Road to the north, Farrer Road and Queensway to the west, Ridout Road, Kay Siang Road, Prince Charles Crescent and Alexandra Canal to the south as well as Zion Road, Grange Road, Tanglin Road, Orange Grove Road and Balmoral Road to the east. 

There are four subzones within the planning area, Chatsworth, Nassim, Ridout and Tyersall.

Infrastructure 
Tanglin is notably among the few residential districts in Singapore where there are no Housing and Development Board flats. Due to its prominent location and high land value, the district mainly comprises private properties such as bungalows and high-rise condominiums. As with Bukit Timah, many affluent Singaporeans and expatriates live in Tanglin.

Mass Rapid Transit rail connections include Farrer Road MRT station of the Circle line, Botanic Gardens MRT station, which is an interchange station between the Circle and Downtown line as well as Stevens MRT station which is an interchange station between Downtown line and the Thomson–East Coast line, Other TEL stations include Napier, which is located at the foot of the Singapore Botanic Gardens and Orchard Boulevard, which is located at the border between Orchard and Tanglin planning areas.

Tanglin is home to several embassies and high commissions. The embassies of Australia, Brunei, France, Indonesia, Israel, Japan, Malaysia, Myanmar, People's Republic of China, Russia, The Philippines and the United States are located in Tanglin. The headquarters of the Ministry of Foreign Affairs (MFA) is also located in Tanglin.

There is only one educational institution in the planning area. The Bukit Timah campus of the National University of Singapore, which comprises the Faculty of Law and the autonomous Lee Kuan Yew School of Public Policy, is the vicinity of the Singapore Botanic Gardens.

Being in close proximity to the Orchard Road shopping belt, there are several shopping malls nearby such as Tanglin Mall, Tanglin Place, Tanglin Shopping Centre and Tudor Court which are located at Tanglin Road, at the boundary between Orchard and Tanglin planning areas. Other shopping facilities include Cluny Court and Serene Centre, which are located at the northwestern tip of Tanglin.

References

 Victor R Savage, Brenda S A Yeoh (2003), Toponymics - A Study of Singapore Street Names, Eastern Universities Press, 

 
Central Region, Singapore
Places in Singapore